Agathobacter rectalis  is a Gram-positive, butyrate-producing, anaerobic, rod-shaped and non-spore-forming bacterium from the genus of Agathobacter with a single flagellate which occur in the rumen content of sheep and cows.

References 

Lachnospiraceae
Bacteria described in 2016